Kumamakhi (Dargwa: Куймамахьи) is a rural locality (a selo) in Musultemakhinsky Selsoviet, Levashinsky District, Republic of Dagestan, Russia. The population was 396 as of 2010. There are 3 streets.

Geography 
Kumamakhi is located 35 km north of Levashi (the district's administrative centre) by road. Chabanmakhi and Vanashimakhi are the nearest rural localities.

Nationalities 
Dargins live there.

References 

Rural localities in Levashinsky District